Marcello Lorenzi (died 1601) was a Roman Catholic prelate who served as Bishop of Strongoli (1600–1601).

Biography
On 31 January 1600, Marcello Lorenzi was appointed during the papacy of Pope Clement VIII as Bishop of Strongoli.
On 13 February 1600, he was consecrated bishop by Antonmaria Sauli, Cardinal-Priest of Santo Stefano al Monte Celio, with Agostino Quinzio, Bishop of Korčula, and Alessandro Filarete, Bishop of Umbriatico, serving as co-consecrators. 
He served as Bishop of Strongoli until his death in 1601.

References

External links and additional sources
 (for Chronology of Bishops) 
 (for Chronology of Bishops) 

17th-century Italian Roman Catholic bishops
Bishops appointed by Pope Clement VIII
1601 deaths